This is a list of cultural venues in the City and County of Swansea, Wales.

Sport

Stadia
List of stadiums with seating capacity:
Liberty Stadium (20,280) 
St Helens Rugby and Cricket Ground (10,500)
Pryderi Park Stadium

Indoor venues
Landore Bowls Stadium

Playing fields
King George V Playing Field, Sketty
Stafford Common

Golf courses
Clyne Golf Club, Mayals
Fairwood Park Golf Course, Fairwood Common
Gower Golf Club, Gowerton
Inco Golf Course, Clydach
Langland Bay Golf Course, Oystermouth
Pennard Golf Course, Pennard
Morriston Golf Course, Morriston

Leisure centres
Bishopston Sports Centre
Cefn Hengoed Leisure Centre, Llansamlet 
City of Swansea Gymnastics Club
Morriston Leisure Centre
Olchfa Pool
Penlan Leisure Centre
Pentrehafod Sports Hall and Pool
Penyrheol Leisure Centre
Pontarddulais Community Leisure Centre
Wales National Pool, Sketty 
Swansea Leisure Centre
Swansea University Sports Centre

Performing arts
List of performing arts venues and their seating capacities:
Albert Hall (800) 
Digital Arena (3,500)
Guildhall
Brangwyn Hall (1,070)
George Hall (200)
Lord Mayor's Reception Room (30-130)
Dylan Thomas Centre (110) 
Dylan Thomas Theatre (144) 
Grand Theatre
Main Theatre (1,000) 
Arts Wing (175)
Great Hall, Swansea University (700)
Patti Pavilion (900)
Penyrheol Theatre (500)
Taliesin Arts Centre (330) Official Site
YMCA Theatre

Choral venues
Tabernacle Chapel, Morriston (3,000)

Open-air venues
Castle Square, city centre
Singleton Park, Sketty
Felindre, venue for the 2006 National Eisteddfod of Wales

Historic and architectural venues
This is a list of historic and architectural places and their use as a cultural venue:
Oystermouth Castle (Shakespeare performances)

Museums and art galleries
1940s Swansea Bay, Crymlyn Burrows
Attic Gallery, Maritime Quarter
Dylan Thomas Centre
Egypt Centre, University of Wales, Swansea
Elysium Gallery
Glynn Vivian Art Gallery
Gower Heritage Centre
Mission Gallery, Maritime Quarter
National Waterfront Museum (until 2005, the Maritime and Industrial Museum)
Swansea Museum

Places of worship
These are a few of the places of worship in Swansea, many of them in the city centre:

Cathedral Church of Saint Joseph, Greenhill (Roman Catholic)
City Church Swansea Dyfatty St SA1 1QQ (Pentecostal)
Dharmavajra Buddhist Centre, Uplands (Buddhist)
Ebenezer Baptist Church (Evangelical)
High Street Unitarian Church, Swansea (Unitarianism)
Kafel Centre, (Racial Attacks and Harassment Monitoring Association)
Kingdom Hall of Jehovah's Witnesses, Uplands (Jehovah's Witnesses)
Mount Pleasant Baptist Church (Evangelical)
Pantygwydr Baptist Church (Baptist)
St. Benedict's, Sketty (Roman Catholic)
St. David's Priory (Roman Catholic)
St Gabriel's, Brynmill (Church in Wales (Anglican))
St. Mary's Church (Church in Wales (Anglican))
St. Paul's Church, Sketty (Church in Wales (Anglican))
Sketty Methodist Church, (Methodist)
Waterfront Community Church (Apostolic)

See also
List of places in Wales
List of places in Swansea

External links
 Gower Heritage Centre Price, direction and general information.
 Attic Gallery Opening times, contact details and details about the gallery.
Swansea Museum More information from South West Wales Tourist Board
Football Pitches in Swansea Senior Football league
Fairwood Park Golf Course Fairwood Park Golf Course
 Golf courses in Swansea Swansea golf courses
Swansea Theatre Arts Register

Mass media and culture in Swansea
Swansea-related lists